María Aura (born María Aura Boullosa on September 25, 1982, in Mexico City, D.F., Mexico) is a Mexican actress.

Filmography

Films

2001 Y tu mamá también...Cecilia Huerta
2001 A la otra
2002 Silk as Girl#1
2002 Aura 
2004 Hotel Garage
2007 Niñas mal as Maribel
2007 Oblivion
2007 Volvo en un minuto
2008 Spam
2008 El garabato
2008 Conozca la cabeza de Juan Pérez as Contorsionista
2008 Llora as Veronica
2008 Arráncame la vida as Pepa
2009 Amar as Martha
2009 Pastorela as Reportera#1
2009 Igualdad as Patricia
2010 Las paredes hablan
2013 Me Late Chocolate

Theater

 1985-1999 El Contrario Luzbel, dir. Alejandro Aura, Mexico
 1990 La Sustancia, Character: Nicolasa, dir. Alejandra Díaz de Cossío, Mexico
 1994 La Historia del Soldado, Character: El Soldado, dir. Alejandro Aura, Mexico
 1999 Los Totoles, Character: Tules Totol, dir. Alejandro Aura, Mexico 
 2000 Kinder Cabarett, Hannover
 2000 Los Hijos De Freud, dir. Jesusa Rodríguez, Mexico  
 2003 Las Criadas, Character: Claire, dir. Lisa Rothe, New York
 2003 Agnes de Dios, Character: Agnes, dir. Lisa Rothe, New York
 2008 El Contrario Luzbel, Character: Luzbel, dir. Pablo Aura, Mexico
 2010 Todos eran mis hijos, dir. Francisco Franco
 2014 Destino Manifiesto, dir. Veronica Falcón

Television

 2003 El alma herida
 2005 Los Plateados as Augusta Robledo
 2008 Vivir por ti as Mariana de Landeros
 2008 Tiempo final
 2009 La noche boca arriba
 2010 Los héroes del norte
 2012 Los héroes del norte 2
 2013 Los hèroes del norte 3

References

External links

1982 births
Living people
Mexican child actresses
Mexican telenovela actresses
Mexican television actresses
Mexican film actresses
Mexican stage actresses
Actresses from Mexico City
20th-century Mexican actresses
21st-century Mexican actresses